Empress Yi'an may refer to:

Empress Dowager Guo (Tang dynasty) (died 848), wife of Emperor Xianzong of Tang
Empress Zhang (Tianqi) (1606–1644), wife of the Tianqi Emperor